The Women's long jump (T37/38) at the 2014 Commonwealth Games as part of the athletics programme was held at Hampden Park on 27 July 2014.

The T37/38 long jump was open to athletes with cerebral palsy under the T37 and T38 classifications. As T37 competitors are deemed to have a greater lack of mobility than T38 athletes a points system is used to bring a form of parity to the results. Therefore, T38 athletes may clear a greater distance but could be ranked lower in the final table than a T37 athlete.

Results

References

Women's long jump (T37 38)
2014
2014 in women's athletics